The President of the Chamber of Deputies of the Parliament of the Czech Republic, also referred to as the Speaker of the Chamber of Deputies, is an elected presiding member of the Chamber of Deputies of the Czech Republic. Since 10 November 2021, the president has been Markéta Pekarová Adamová of TOP09.

The president shall:
 Represent the Chamber of Deputies in external affairs
 Nominate the Prime Minister to be appointed by the President of the republic in compliance with the second sentence of Section 4, Article 68 of the Constitution
 Accept the oath of the members of the Supreme Audit Office
 Forward all draft bills and all drafts of international treaties that have to be approved by the Parliament to the Senate after their passing/ratification by the Chamber of Deputies
 Forward all passed bills to the President of the republic for signing
 Forward all passed bills to the Prime Minister for signing
 Sign the acts of law and declarations adopted by the Chamber of Deputies and/or other documents issued by the Chamber of Deputies
 Call an alternate member if a mandate becomes vacant and issue a certificate verifying that the alternate has become a deputy
 Approve the extradition of any Deputy caught in the course of a criminal offence or immediately afterwards
 Specify the order, in which the vice-presidents of the Chamber of Deputies are entitled to deputise
 Summon, open and close the meetings of the Chamber of Deputies and the joint meetings of the Chamber of Deputies and the Senate
 Summon the Chamber of Deputies before the agreed date if it is in recess
 Interrupt the meetings of the Chamber of Deputies in the event of disruptions or if the Chamber of Deputies does not constitute a quorum
 Appoint and recall the Secretary General

See also 
 List of presidents of the Chamber of Deputies (Czech Republic)

External links
 Official website of the Chamber of Deputies of the Parliament of the Czech Republic 

 
Chamber of Deputies of the Czech Republic